"The Rebel" is a poem which was written by the famous Irish revolutionary, poet, Irish language teacher and scholar, Padraic Pearse. He would go on to take a leading role in the Easter Rising of 1916, for his part he would be executed by British forces.

References

External links
World of the Rebel - Audio

Irish poems